Torah High Schools of San Diego (THSSD) is a private 9-12 girls Jewish high school in San Diego, California, United States that was founded in 1999. It is an affiliate of the Rabbinical Seminary of America - Yeshiva Chofetz Chaim of New York City.

The school employs a curriculum of college preparatory as well as Torah studies.

Torah High is the first girls' Orthodox Jewish high school in the city of San Diego and currently the only Orthodox Jewish girls' single-sex education high school in San Diego county. Torah High is also the first Western Association of Schools and Colleges (WASC) accredited Jewish High School in San Diego.

The school is located at the Congregation Beth Israel campus in University City, San Diego, California, located in San Diego county.

References

External links 

 

Girls' schools in California
High schools in San Diego
Jewish day schools in California
Jews and Judaism in San Diego
Mesivtas
Orthodox Judaism in California
Private high schools in California
Educational institutions established in 1999
1999 establishments in California